Nanda Hangkhim is a writer in the Nepali language. He is from Darjeeling district, India. He is a recipient of the Sahitya Akademi Award (2014) for his collection of short stories Satta Grahan.

Bibliography
 Mrtyu Divasa
 Arko Anuhāra

See also 

 Indra Bahadur Rai
 Agam Singh Giri
 Parijat

References

Nepali-language writers from India
Recipients of the Sahitya Akademi Award in Nepali
People from Darjeeling district
Living people
1944 births
Indian Gorkhas
Nepali-language poets from India